This article describes the qualification for the 2019 Women's European Volleyball Championship.

Hungary, Poland, Slovakia and Turkey as host nations were directly qualified. The eight best placed teams at the 2017 edition also gained direct entries into the tournament.
24 teams had registered for participation and compete for the remaining 12 places at the final tournament. The 24 teams were divided into six groups of four teams. The group winners and runners-up will advance to the final round.

Qualified teams

Direct qualification
2017 Women's European Volleyball Championship final standings

Format
There being six pools of four teams each, the winners and runners-up of each pool will qualify for the 2019 Women’s EuroVolley. The groups will be played in a home and away round-robin format from August 2018 to January 2019. The pool composition results from the latest European Ranking for men’s and women’s national teams – as of September 4 and October 2, 2017, respectively – with teams being placed across the pools according to the serpentine system.

Pool standing procedure
 Number of matches won
 Match points
 Sets ratio
 Points ratio
 If the tie continues as per the point ratio between two teams, the priority will be given to the team which won the last match between them. When the tie in points ratio is between three or more teams, a new classification of these teams in the terms of points 1, 2 and 3 will be made taking into consideration only the matches in which they were opposed to each other.
Match won 3–0 or 3–1: 3 match points for the winner, 0 match points for the loser
Match won 3–2: 2 match points for the winner, 1 match point for the loser

Results

All times are local.

Pool A

|}

|}

Pool B 

|}

|}

Pool C

|}

|}

Pool D

|}

|}

Pool E

|}

|}

Pool F

|}

|}

References

External links

2019
2018 in women's volleyball
2019 in women's volleyball
Qualification for volleyball competitions